Space Launch Complex 4 (SLC-4) is a launch and landing site at Vandenberg Space Force Base, California, U.S. It has two pads, both of which are used by SpaceX for Falcon 9, one for launch operations, and other as Landing Zone 4 (LZ-4) for SpaceX landings.

The complex was previously used by Atlas and Titan rockets between 1963 and 2005. It consisted of two launch pads, SLC-4W and SLC-4E, which were formerly designated  PALC-2-3 and PALC-2-4 respectively. Both pads were built for use by Atlas-Agena rockets, but were later rebuilt to handle Titan rockets. The designation SLC-4 was applied at the time of the conversion to launch Titan launch vehicles.

Both pads at Space Launch Complex 4 are currently leased by SpaceX. SLC-4E is leased as a launch site for the Falcon 9 rocket, which first flew from Vandenberg on 29 September 2013, following a 24-month refurbishment program which had started in early 2011. SpaceX began a five-year lease of Launch Complex 4 West in February 2015 in order to use that area as a landing pad to bring back VTVL return-to-launch-site (RTLS) first-stage boosters of the reusable Falcon 9 launch vehicle. That pad was later named by SpaceX as Landing Zone 4 and first used operationally for a Falcon 9 booster landing in 2018.

SLC-4E

Atlas-Agena 
The first launch from PALC2-4 occurred on 14 August 1964, when a KH-7 satellite was launched by an Atlas-Agena D. After 27 Atlas-Agena launches, the last of which was on 4 June 1967, the complex was deactivated.

Titan IIID
During 1971 the complex was reactivated and refurbished for use by the Martin Marietta Titan III launch vehicles. The Titan IIID made its maiden flight from SLC-4E on 15 June 1971, launching the first KH-9 Hexagon satellite. The first KH-11 Kennan satellite was launched from the complex on 19 December 1976. All 22 Titan IIIDs were launched from SLC-4E, with the last occurring on 17 November 1982.

Titan 34D
The complex was then refurbished to accommodate the Martin Marietta Titan 34D. Seven Titan 34Ds were launched between 20 June 1983, and 6 November 1988. 
SLC-4E hosted one of the most dramatic launch accidents in US history when a Titan 34D-9 carrying a KH-9 photoreconnaissance satellite exploded a few hundred feet above the pad on 18 April 1986. The enormous blast showered the launch complex with debris and toxic propellant (hydrazine and dinitrogen tetroxide), resulting in extensive damage. 16 months after the accident, the pad was back in commission when it hosted a successful launch of a KH-11 satellite.

Titan IV
The last Titan variant to use the complex was the Titan IV, starting on 8 March 1991, with the launch of Lacrosse 2. On 19 October 2005, the last flight of a Titan rocket occurred, when a Titan IVB was launched from SLC-4E, with an Improved Crystal satellite. Following this launch, the complex was deactivated, having been used for 68 launches.

Falcon 9
SpaceX refurbished SLC–4E for Falcon 9 launches in a 24-month process that began in early 2011. The draft environmental impact assessment with a finding of "no significant impact" was published in February 2011. Demolition began on the pad's fixed and mobile service towers in summer 2011.

By late 2012, SpaceX anticipated that the initial launch from the Vandenberg pad would be in 2013, with the larger variant Falcon 9 v1.1. As the pad was nearing completion in February 2013, the first launch was scheduled for summer 2013, but was delayed until September 2013.

Launch history

Statistics

Atlas (1964–1967)

Titan IIID / 34D (1971–1988)

Titan IV (1991–2005)

Falcon 9 (since 2013)

Upcoming launches

SLC-4W

SLC-4W started operations in 1963 as Space Launch Complex 4W, and continued as an operational launch site through 2003. In 2015, SpaceX started conversion of the launch site into Landing Zone LZ-4. Landing operations commenced in 2018 at LZ-4.

SLC-4W Launch history

Statistics

By rocket type

Atlas-Agena 
The first launch to use what is now SLC-4 occurred on 12 July 1963, when an Atlas LV-3 Agena-D launched the first KH-7 Gambit reconnaissance satellite, from PALC-2-3. Twelve Atlas-Agenas launches were conducted from PALC-2-3, with the last occurring on 12 March 1965.

Titan IIIB 
Following this, it was rebuilt as SLC-4W, a Titan launch complex. The first Titan launch from SLC-4W was a Titan IIIB, on 29 July 1966. All 68 Titan IIIB launches occurred from SLC-4W, with the last on 12 February 1987.

Titan 23G 
After the retirement of the Titan IIIB, it became a Titan 23G launch site, and twelve Titan II launches, using the 23G orbital configuration, were conducted between 5 September 1988 and 18 October 2003. Following the retirement of the Titan 23G, SLC-4W was deactivated. 93 rockets were launched from SLC-4W.

SLC-4W was the site of the launch of Clementine, the only spacecraft to be launched from Vandenberg to the Moon, which was launched by a Titan 23G on 25 January 1994.

Launch timeline 1963–2003

LZ-4

Development  History
SpaceX signed a five-year lease of Launch Complex 4W in February 2015, in order to use the area to land reusable launch vehicles at the pad. The location is being used for vertical landing of Return-To-Launch-Site (RTLS) first-stage boosters of the Falcon 9 rockets that are launched from the adjacent SLC-4E launch pad. This novel use of SLC-4W had initially surfaced in July 2014 when NASASpaceFlight.com published that SpaceX was considering leasing SLC-4W for use as a RTLS vertical-landing facility for reusable first-stage boosters.

Principal structures on the pad were demolished in September 2014 as construction of the landing pad began and was completed sometime around 2017.

Landing Statistics

Landing Outcomes (Falcon 9)

Booster landings

Detailed landing history 
For landings at sea, see Autonomous spaceport drone ship

SpaceX has perfected RTLS landings on two landing pads that it has built at Cape Canaveral Space Force Station. It was initially thought that the booster used to launch a fourth batch of ten Iridium NEXT satellites in December 2017 would be the first to land at Vandenberg AFB  but this mission was ultimately performed in expendable mode. In July 2018, SpaceX applied for a permit to the Federal Communications Commission (FCC) for post-landing communications with a first stage of a Falcon 9 rocket at SLC-4W, pointing to a possible landing sometime in September 2018, possibly for the SAOCOM 1A mission although this was later rescheduled for 8 October 2018 (UTC). A few weeks prior to this first landing attempt it was known to the public, again via FCC permits and also public warnings about sonic booms in the area, that SpaceX had renamed this pad as Landing Zone 4. Finally, this pad was first used for a rocket booster landing of a first stage of a Falcon 9 launch vehicle in October 2018, recovering the booster that had just launched the Argentinian SAOCOM 1A satellite.

References

External links 

 
 

Vandenberg Space Force Base
SpaceX facilities
Space Launch Complex 4
Space Launch Complex 4